Sussex was an electoral district of the Legislative Assembly in the Australian state of Western Australia from 1890 to 1950.

The district was based in south-western Western Australia, including areas such as Busselton and Margaret River, and was named for the Sussex land district which formed its original boundaries. It was one of the original 30 seats contested at the 1890 election. It was safely conservative for its entire existence, and was always held by a member of the Liberal Party (or its predecessors) or the Country Party. From 1904 to 1917, the district's representative was Frank Wilson, who served as Premier of Western Australia from 1910 to 1911 and again from 1916 to 1917.

Sussex was abolished at the 1950 election, and replaced with the new seat of Vasse. Its last member, Stewart Bovell of the Liberal Party, transferred to Vasse.

Members

Election results

Sussex